The Billboard Latin Tropical Airplay chart ranks the best-performing tropical songs of the United States. Published by Billboard magazine, the data are compiled by Nielsen SoundScan based on each single's weekly airplay. The lists contains the songs that reached number one on the Latin Tropical Airplay chart in 2000.

Chart history

References

2000
United States Latin Tropical Airplay
2000 in Latin music